{{DISPLAYTITLE:C16H12O6}}
The molecular formula C16H12O6 (molar mass : 300.26 g/mol, exact mass : 300.063388) may refer to:

 Chrysoeriol, a flavone
 Diosmetin, a flavone
 Evariquinone, an anthraquinone
 Hematein, an oxidized derivative of haematoxylin used in staining
 Hispidulin, a flavone
 Kalafungin, an antibiotic
 Kaempferide, a flavonol
 Leptosidin, an aurone
 Pratensein, an isoflavone
 Psi-tectorigenin, an isoflavone
 Tectorigenin, an isoflavone